Alexander A. Beilinson (born 1957) is the David and Mary Winton Green University professor at the University of Chicago and works on mathematics.  His research  has spanned representation theory, algebraic geometry and mathematical physics.  In 1999, Beilinson was  awarded the Ostrowski Prize with Helmut Hofer.
In 2017, he was elected to the National Academy of Sciences.

Work
In 1978, Beilinson published a paper on coherent sheaves and several problems in linear algebra.  His two-page note in the journal Functional Analysis and Its Applications was one of the papers on the study of derived categories of coherent sheaves.

In 1981, Beilinson announced a proof of the Kazhdan–Lusztig conjectures and Jantzen conjectures with Joseph Bernstein.  Independent of Beilinson and Bernstein, Brylinski and Kashiwara obtained a proof of the Kazhdan–Lusztig conjectures.  However, the proof of Beilinson–Bernstein introduced a method of localization.  This established a geometric description of the entire category of representations of the Lie algebra, by "spreading out" representations as geometric objects living on the flag variety. These geometric objects naturally have an intrinsic notion of parallel transport: they are D-modules.

In 1982, Beilinson published his own conjectures about the existence of motivic cohomology groups for schemes, provided as hypercohomology groups of a complex of abelian groups and related to algebraic K-theory by a motivic spectral sequence, analogous to the Atiyah–Hirzebruch spectral sequence in algebraic topology. These conjectures have since been dubbed the Beilinson-Soulé conjectures; they are intertwined with Vladimir Voevodsky's program to develop a homotopy theory for schemes.

In 1984, Beilinson published the paper Higher Regulators and values of L-functions, in which he related higher regulators for K-theory and their relationship to L-functions.  The paper also provided a generalization to arithmetic varieties of the Lichtenbaum conjecture for K-groups of number rings, the Hodge conjecture, the Tate conjecture about algebraic cycles, the Birch and Swinnerton-Dyer conjecture about elliptic curves, and Bloch's conjecture about K2 of elliptic curves.

Beilinson continued to work on algebraic K-theory throughout the mid-1980s.  He collaborated with Pierre Deligne on the developing a motivic interpretation of Don Zagier's polylogarithm conjectures.

From the early 1990s onwards, Beilinson worked with Vladimir Drinfeld to rebuild the theory of vertex algebras.  After some informal circulation, this research was published in 2004 in a form of a monograph on chiral algebras. This has led to new advances in conformal field theory, string theory and the geometric Langlands program. He was elected a Fellow of the American Academy of Arts and Sciences in 2008. He was a visiting scholar at the Institute for Advanced Study in the fall of 1994 and again from 1996 to 1998. In 2018, he received the Wolf Prize in Mathematics and in 2020 the Shaw Prize in Mathematics.

Selected publications

References

External links

Letter from Beilinson to Soule containing his conjectures on motivic cohomology
Citation for the 1999 Ostrowski Prize

Living people
University of Chicago faculty
20th-century American mathematicians
21st-century American mathematicians
Russian mathematicians
Algebraic geometers
1957 births
Institute for Advanced Study visiting scholars
Fellows of the American Academy of Arts and Sciences
Members of the United States National Academy of Sciences